The 2014 National Women Football Championship was the 10th season of the National Women Football Championship, the top-tier of women's football in Pakistan. The tournament started on 12 August and concluded on 29 August 2014, with three group stages played in Lahore and one group stage played in Karachi.

Young Rising Stars were the defending champions. They were knocked-out in the quarter-finals by Pakistan Army losing 3–2. Balochistan United won the championship after defeating WAPDA 7–0 in finals. Balochistan United were the highest goal-scoring team in the tournament as well, scoring 64 goals in 6 matches, with top-scorer Hajra Khan scoring 31 goals.

Teams
A total of 16 teams participated in the tournaments:

 Azad-Jammu Kashmir
 Balochistan
 Balochistan United
 Diya
 FATA
 Frontier College
 Gilgit-Baltistan FA
 Higher Education Commission
 Islamabad
 Khyber Pakhtunkhwa
 Model Town
 Pakistan Army
 Punjab
 Sindh
 WAPDA
 Young Rising StarsTH

Notes TH = Championship title holders

Group stages

Group A

Group B

Group C

Group D

Knockout round

Quarter-finals

Semi-finals

Third place

Finals

Top scorer

References

External links
 GSA 2014 National Women's Football Championship
 FPDC 2014 National Women's Football Championship

National Women Football Championship seasons
W1
W1
Pakistan
Pakistan

2014 in Pakistani women's sport